Achille Giovannoni (14 February 1926 – 25 February 2014) was a French rower. He competed in the men's double sculls event at the 1952 Summer Olympics.

References

External links
 
 

1926 births
2014 deaths
French male rowers
Olympic rowers of France
Rowers at the 1952 Summer Olympics
Place of birth missing